Paul Edward Adamson  is a British editor and the chairman of Forum Europe and founder of E!Sharp. Adamson has also been involved in other organizations, including Rand Europe, YouGov-Cambridge, and Covington. He was made an Officer of the Order of the British Empire in 2012 and Chevalier in the Ordre national du Mérite by the French government in 2016.

Early life
Adamson was born in Chester, Cheshire, United Kingdom. He is married to Denyse Molaro, and has two children. He resides in Brussels, Belgium.

Career
Adamson became the chairman of Forum Europe. Additionally, he founded E!Sharp, an online magazine dedicated to covering the European Union and Europe's place in the world. He was a Senior European Policy Advisor at Covington, a member of Rand Europe's Council of Advisors, sits on the external advisory board of YouGov-Cambridge (a polling think-tank), is a member of the advisory group of the Washington European Society and of the Brussels chapter of Women in International Security (WiiS).

Adamson is a Visiting Professor at the Policy Institute, King's College London, a patron of the UACES (the academic association of Contemporary European Studies), and a Fellow of the UK Academy of Social Sciences. He founded the consulting firm Adamson Associates, which was sold to Weber Shandwick and The Centre and was later sold to Edelman. In 2012, Adamson was made an Officer of the Order of the British Empire “for services to promoting understanding of the European Union”, a part of the Queen's 2012 New Year Honours Diplomatic Service and Overseas List. In 2016 he was made a Chevalier in the Ordre national du Mérite by the French government. He is a member of the advisory board of the Centre for European Reform.

References

External links
E!Sharp
WIIS - Women in International Security Brussels

Living people
British editors
Officers of the Order of the British Empire
Year of birth missing (living people)